John McNally (born 30 August 1941) is an English guitarist. He was a member of The Searchers, who were a big part of the Mersey sound in the early 1960s.

Biography

Early life
McNally was born in Walton, Liverpool, and started off playing skiffle and said that he was first influenced by country singers like Hank Williams, Johnny Cash, and Hank Snow but after playing at the Star-Club in Hamburg, Germany, and specifically, playing with Fats Domino at the club, his music took a different course towards soul and rhythm & blues. McNally attended St Mary's College.

The Searchers

In 1957, McNally formed the band the Searchers, named after the 1956 film of the same name. and signed to Pye Records in 1963. Their first single, a cover of The Drifters 1961 song "Sweets for My Sweet", went to number one. 

Their debut album, Meet The Searchers, was released in August 1963. The album primarily consisted of covers. Their cover of The Clovers "Love Potion No. 9" went to number two on the U.S Cash Box and their version of Pete Seeger's modern folk-style song "Where Have All the Flowers Gone?" went to No. 22 and stayed for 21 weeks. Other hits by the group included "Needles and Pins", "Don't Throw Your Love Away" and "When You Walk in the Room". The Searchers became one of the first successful Beat music bands and were one of the most popular groups in the British Invasion in the early 1960s. McNally rarely sang lead or co-lead on their albums or performances, with singing mainly done by Mike Pender, Chris Curtis or Tony Jackson. The band's last album released during their 1960s era was Take Me for What I'm Worth, released in November 1965. In total, the Searchers released nine albums between 1963 and 1988.

McNally remained with the band over 60 years, touring alongside Frank Allen, who replaced Tony Jackson in August 1964, until their last concert on 31 March 2019. Following Mike Pender's departure in December 1985, McNally was the last original member of the classic 1960s line-up. McNally suffered a stroke in September 2017 and took a three-month break from touring. It was announced on the band's website in 2021 that they would undertake a further farewell tour in 2023.

Personal life
John McNally has been married to Mary McNally since 1964.

Equipment

McNally has used a wide range of guitars during his career. John has been known to use a Rickenbacker 360/12, a Hofner Club 60, and a Fender Telecaster.

Discography

Studio Albums
 1963 – Meet The Searchers
 1963 – Sugar and Spice
 1964 – It's the Searchers
 1965 – Sounds Like Searchers 
 1965 – Take Me for What I'm Worth
 1972 – Second Take 
 1979 – Searchers
 1981 – Play for Today
 1988 – Hungry Hearts
Note:

References

See also

List of Rickenbacker players

Living people
1941 births
Musicians from Liverpool
English male singers
English songwriters
People educated at St Mary's College, Crosby
People from Crosby, Merseyside
English people of Irish descent
English rock singers
English rock guitarists
Rhythm guitarists
English male guitarists
The Searchers (band) members
British male songwriters